Michael Theodore Eismann (born 1964) is an American scientist and researcher working at the Air Force Research Laboratory. He is a former editor of Optical Engineering and a member of the NATO Sensors and Electronics Technology panel. In 2023, Eismann was elevated to fellow membership of the IEEE.

Education and early life 
Eismann was born in 1964 in Covington, Kentucky. In 1985, he received a Bachelor's degree in Physics from Thomas More College, Kentucky. In 1987, he gained a Master's degree in Electrical Engineering from the Georgia Institute of Technology. Eismann received a PhD in Electro-Optics from the University of Dayton, Ohio, in 2004, overseen by Russell Craig Hardie. His dissertation was Resolution enhancement of hyperspectral imagery using maximum a posteriori estimation with a stochastic mixing model.

Career 
Eismann is Chief Scientist at the Sensors Directorate of the Air Force Research Laboratory (AFRL), being promoted in December 2014. He had joined AFRL in 1996 and previously served as the Air Force Senior Scientist for Electro-Optical and Infrared Sensors. His main areas of research are passive infrared imaging and hyperspectral remote sensing, areas which he is considered an authority on in the scientific community. Eismann has authored multiple journal articles and book chapters on these areas. Eismann is also an Adjunct Professor at the Air Force Institute of Technology. 

Eismann's previous work includes time at the Environmental Research Institute of Michigan (1987-1996), serving as the U.S. National Representative on the NATO Sensors and Electronics Technology panel and serving on the Society of Photo-Optical Instrumentation Engineers (SPIE) Board of Directors. He served some time as Editor-in-Chief of the journal Optical Engineering, succeeding Ronald Driggers. He was in the position from 2014-2020.

Awards and honours 
Made a fellow of the Air Force Research Laboratory in 2008
Made an SPIE fellow in 2010
Made a fellow of the Military Sensing Symposia in 2010
2012 SPIE President's Award
2018 Meritorious Senior Professional Presidential Rank Award
2018 Optica/SPIE Joseph W. Goodman Book Writing Award for Hyperspectral remote sensing
2020 NATO Science and Technology Achievement Award
Elevated to fellow member of the IEEE in 2023 "for extraordinary technical leadership of hyperspectral remote sensing and infrared technology research for defense applications"

Publications 
 Eismann, Michael Theodore:  Resolution enhancement of hyperspectral imagery using maximum a posteriori estimation with a stochastic mixing model. Doctoral thesis, University of Dayton, 2004.
 Eismann, Michael Theodore and Stein, David: Stochastic Mixture Modeling. Book chapter in Hyperspectral Data Exploitation: Theory and Applications. Wiley, 2007. 
 Eismann, Michael Theodore: Hyperspectral remote sensing. SPIE, 2012. 
 LaMaster, Daniel and Eismann, Michael Theodore: Passive Polarimetric Imaging. Book chapter in Multi-Dimensional Imaging. Wiley, 2014.

References 

Fellow Members of the IEEE
Fellows of SPIE
Presidential Rank Award recipients
Air Force Research Laboratory people
University of Dayton alumni
1964 births
Living people